The Franconian Rezat is a  river in southern Germany. It is the western, left source river of the Rednitz. It rises in the Franconian Heights near Oberdachstetten. It flows generally east through the towns Lehrberg, Ansbach, Windsbach and Spalt. Together with the Swabian Rezat, it forms the Rednitz in Georgensgmünd.

See also
List of rivers of Bavaria

References

Rivers of Bavaria
Ansbach (district)
Roth (district)
Rivers of Germany